Brownstown can refer to some places: 

in the United States

Brownstown, Arkansas
Brownstown, Illinois
Brownstown, Indiana
Brownstown, Crawford County, Indiana
Brownstown Township, Jackson County, Indiana
Brownstown Township, Michigan
Brownstown, Brown County, Ohio
Brownstown, Wyandot County, Ohio
Brownstown, Cambria County, Pennsylvania
Brownstown, Lancaster County, Pennsylvania
Brownstown, Washington
Brownstown, Cabell County, West Virginia

Ireland

Brownstown, County Kildare
Brownstown, County Tipperary
Brownstown, County Westmeath
Brwonstown Head, in County Waterford

See also

 Battle of Brownstown (1812) at Brownstown Township, Michigan, USA, in the War of 1812
 Brown's Town, Saint-Ann, Middlesex, Jamaica
 Brownton, McLeod, Minnesota, USA
Browntown (disambiguation)
Brown (disambiguation)
Town (disambiguation)